Presidential elections were held in the Orange Free State on 5 November 1863. The result was a victory for Johannes Brand, who was inaugurated as the fourth President of the country on 2 February 1864.

References

1863 elections in Africa
Elections in the Orange Free State
Presidential election